Placerville is the name of several places in the United States:

 Placerville, California
 Placerville, Colorado
 Placerville, Idaho